SWOSUPalooza is an annual concert on the Weatherford campus of Southwestern Oklahoma State University (SWOSU). Borrowing its name, in part, from the Lollapalooza festival, the event is sponsored and produced by the SWOSU Student Government Association (SGA), and is considered one of SWOSU's signature events. It showcases local and regional musicians, and frequently brings national recording artists to western Oklahoma as headliners.

History
The idea for SWOSUPalooza originated in 1997 among a group of friends attending SWOSU, but was not acted on until the 1999–2000 academic year. SWOSU SGA struggled to secure funding for the first concert, and still lacked the needed funds as late as a month prior to the performance.

SWOSUPalooza was a free campus event for the first ten years of its existence. In 2010, SWOSU SGA voted to implement a minimal ticket price in order to raise additional funds and be able to bring in bigger bands.

SWOSUPalooza 21, originally scheduled to take place on April 9, 2020, was rescheduled for August 20 following a full transition to virtual course delivery for the spring 2020 semester due to the COVID-19 pandemic. It was later postponed again until October 22, and then yet again to March 25, 2021. Thus, there was no concert in 2020.

Concerts

Notes

References

External links 

Southwestern Oklahoma State University
Tourist attractions in Custer County, Oklahoma
Music festivals established in 2000
2000 establishments in Oklahoma